Albert Edward Curtis VC (6 January 1866 – 18 March 1940) was an English recipient of the Victoria Cross, the highest and most prestigious award for gallantry in the face of the enemy that can be awarded to British and Commonwealth forces.

Details
Curtis was 34 years old, and a private in the 2nd Battalion, The East Surrey Regiment, British Army during the Second Boer War when the following deed took place at Onderbank Spruit for which he was awarded the VC:

Further information
He later achieved the rank of sergeant and served as a Yeoman Warder. He died on 18 March 1940. His medal is in the Lord Ashcroft collection

Curtis is interred at Bells Hill Burial Ground, Chipping Barnet.

References

Monuments to Courage (David Harvey, 1999)
The Register of the Victoria Cross (This England, 1997)
Victoria Crosses of the Anglo-Boer War (Ian Uys, 2000)

External links
 

1866 births
1940 deaths
British recipients of the Victoria Cross
Second Boer War recipients of the Victoria Cross
East Surrey Regiment soldiers
People from Guildford
British Army recipients of the Victoria Cross
Military personnel from Guildford
Burials in England